Circumflex iliac artery may refer to:

 Deep circumflex iliac artery
 Superficial circumflex iliac artery